Henridorff is a commune in the Moselle department in Grand Est in north-eastern France.

Geography 
The village is located 3 km south of the national road 4, north of the valley of the Zorn. The pass of Henridorff, the "Steig", with a slope of 6% connects the valley to the village.

It is a village surrounded by beautiful forests of broad-leaved trees (mainly beech) and conifers.

The geological base is formed of Vosges sandstone or red sandstone. Also numerous quarries from which sandstone was extracted are located near the village.

History 
In 1614, Duke Henry II of Lorraine had the Schwangen woods cleared to build the village of Henridorff for the Catholics expelled from the territory of the Prince Palatine.

See also
 Communes of the Moselle department

References

External links
 

Communes of Moselle (department)